Chihiro (ちひろ, チヒロ,千尋) is a female and male Japanese given name.

Possible writings 
Chihiro can be written using various kanji, which can alter the name's meaning:
千尋, "thousand fathoms"
千博, "thousand gains"
千裕, "thousand, abundance"
千紘, "thousand, large or huge"
The name can also be rendered in hiragana and katakana as ちひろ and チヒロ respectively.

People with the name 
Chihiro Fujioka (born 1959, 藤岡千尋), Japanese  director
, Japanese professional wrestler
, Japanese shogi player
, Japanese swimmer
Chihiro Iwasaki (born 1918, いわさき　ちひろ 岩崎 知弘), Japanese artist and illustrator
Chihiro Kameyama (born 1956, 亀山千尋), a Japanese businessman
Chihiro Kaneko (born 1983, 金子千尋), Nippon Professional Baseball pitcher for the Orix Buffaloes
Chihiro Kato (volleyball) (born 1988, 加藤千尋), Japanese volleyball player
Chihiro Kawakami, a Japanese voice actress
Chihiro Kondo, (近藤千尋), a Japanese fashion model
Chihiro Kusaka (born 1956, 日下ちひろ), Japanese voice actress
Chihiro Minato (born 1960, 港千尋), Japanese photographer
, Japanese footballer
Chihiro Onitsuka (born 1980, 鬼束ちひろ), Japanese singer-songwriter and pianist
Chihiro Otsuka (born 1986, 大塚ちひろ), Japanese actress
, Japanese gymnast
Chihiro Suzuki, (born 1977, 鈴木千尋), Japanese voice actor
, Japanese actress
Chihiro Yonekura (born 1972, 米倉千尋), Japanese singer

Fictional characters 
Chihiro Ayasato (绫里 千尋), a character in the Phoenix Wright: Ace Attorney. (Mia Fey in the localisation)
Chihiro Ogino (荻野 千尋), the main character in Spirited Away
Chihiro Sengoku, monster teacher from Sakurasou
Chihiro (千尋), a secondary character in Azumanga Daioh
Chihiro Shindou (千尋), a main character in Ef: A Fairy Tale of the Two.
Chihiro Fujimi, a Oh My Goddess! character
Chihiro Furuya, the main character in Sankarea
Chihiro Fushimi, a secondary character in Persona 3
Chihiro Kosaka (ちひろ), a heroine in The World God Only Knows
Chihiro Itou, a character from Suki Desu Suzuki-kun!!
Chihiro Fujisaki (不二咲 千尋), a character featured in Danganronpa: Trigger Happy Havoc
Chihiro Mayuzumi (千尋), a secondary character in Kuroko no basket
 Chihiro Sawaki (澤木 千尋), a secondary character in Rich Man, Poor Woman
 Chihiro (千尋), a main character in Kamen Rider Amazons
Chihiro Usui (碓井千紘), member of RayGlanZ in the game Readyyy! Project

See also 
Sega Chihiro is an arcade system from Sega based on the architecture of the Xbox

Japanese unisex given names